Hites Cove (also  called Hite's Cove, less commonly Hite Cove) is an unincorporated community in Mariposa County, California. It is accessed via Hites Cove Road.

The Hites Cove post office operated from 1868 to 1869, and from 1878 to 1889. The Hite post office operated from 1901 to 1902. The name honors John Hite, who discovered gold at the site.

References

Unincorporated communities in California
Unincorporated communities in Mariposa County, California